Listed below are the UCI Professional Continental and Continental Teams that compete in road bicycle racing events of the UCI Continental Circuits organised by the International Cycling Union (UCI). The UCI Continental Circuits are divided in 5 continental zones, America, Europe, Asia, Africa and Oceania.


UCI Professional Continental Teams 

According to the UCI Rulebook, "a professional continental team is an organisation created to take part in road events open to professional continental teams. It is known by a unique name and registered with the UCI in accordance with the provisions below.
 The professional continental team comprises all the riders registered with the UCI as members of the team, the paying agent, the sponsors and all other persons contracted by the paying agent and/or the sponsors to provide for the continuing operation of the team (manager, team manager, coach, paramedical assistant, mechanic, etc.).
 Each professional continental team must employ at least 14 riders, 2 team managers and 3 other staff (paramedical assistants, mechanics, etc.) on a full time basis for the whole registration year."

List of 2007 UCI Africa Tour professional teams

List of 2007 UCI America Tour professional teams

List of 2007 UCI Asia Tour professional teams

List of 2007 UCI Europe Tour professional teams 
Updated for 2007; retrieved on January 22, 2007

List of 2007 UCI Oceania Tour professional teams 
Updated for 2007; retrieved on January 22, 2007

UCI Continental Teams 

According to the UCI Rulebook, "a UCI continental team is a team of road riders recognised and licensed to take part in events on the continental calendars by the national federation of the nationality of the majority of its riders and registered with the UCI. The precise structure (legal and financial status, registration, guarantees, standard contract, etc.) of these teams shall be determined by the regulations of the national federation."

Riders may be professional or amateur.

List of 2007 UCI Africa Tour teams

List of 2007 UCI America Tour teams 
Updated for 2007

List of 2007 UCI Asia Tour teams

Updated for 2007

List of 2007 UCI Europe Tour teams

List of 2007 UCI Oceania Tour teams

References

2007 in road cycling
2007